Slobodan Mihajlovski (born February 23, 1982) is a Macedonian professional basketball Power forward.

External links
 Slobodan Mihajlovski
 Slobodan Mihajlovski Player Profile, KK Rabotnicki AD Skopje, News, Stats - Eurobasket

References

1982 births
Living people
Macedonian men's basketball players
Power forwards (basketball)
People from Gostivar